was a feudal domain under the Tokugawa shogunate of the Edo period, located in Kazusa Province (modern-day Chiba Prefecture), Japan. It was centered on Ōtaki Castle in what is now the town of Ōtaki, Chiba.

History
The original Ōtaki Castle was built by the Satomi clan, rulers of most of the Bōsō Peninsula during the Sengoku period. Following the Battle of Odawara in 1590, the Kantō region was assigned to Tokugawa Ieyasu by the warlord Toyotomi Hideyoshi, who also restricted the Satomi to Awa Province for their lukewarm support of his campaigns against the Later Hōjō clan. Tokugawa Ieyasu appointed Honda Tadakatsu, one of his Four Generals, to be daimyō of the newly formed 100,000 koku Ōtaki Domain.

Following the Battle of Sekigahara, Honda Tadakatsu was promoted to Kuwana Domain, and Ōtaki was assigned to Honda Tadatomo, from another branch of the Honda clan, with a reduction in revenues to 50,000 koku. Honda Tadatomo died at the Battle of Tennōji and his son, Honda Masatomo was reassigned to Tatsuno Domain in Harima Province.

The Honda were replaced by the Abe Masatsugu, a hero of the Siege of Osaka, but the domain's size was further reduced to 30,000 koku. Abe Masatsugu was later transferred to Odawara Domain following the disgrace of the Ōkubo clan in the Ōkubo Nagayasu Incident of 1614, and Ōtaki Domain was suppressed in 1619.

The domain was briefly revived from 1623 to 1625 for Aoyama Tadatoshi, the tutor of the 3rd Tokugawa shōgun, Iemitsu, with its size further reduced to 20,000 koku. After his death, Ōtaki Domain reverted to tenryō territory directly under the control of the Tokugawa shogunate until 1638.

The Abe clan regained control of Ōtaki Domain in April 1638, and ruled it to 1702, when they were replaced by Inagaki Shigetomi, who ruled for only 21 days before being reassigned to Karasuyama Domain in Shimotsuke Province. The domain then came under the control of the Ōkōchi branch of the Matsudaira clan, who continued to rule Ōtaki until the Meiji Restoration. The final daimyo of Ōtaki Domain, Ōkōchi Masatada, initially fought for the pro-Tokugawa forces at the Battle of Toba–Fushimi in the Boshin War, but later changed his allegiance to the new Meiji government. He was appointed domain governor under the new administration, until the abolition of the han system in July 1871 and subsequently became a viscount under the kazoku peerage. Ōtaki Domain became "Ōtaki Prefecture", which merged with the short lived "Kisarazu Prefecture" in November 1871, which later became part of Chiba Prefecture.

The domain had a population of 21,481 people in 4202 households per an 1869 census. The domain maintained its primary residence (kamiyashiki) in Edo at Surugadai.

Holdings at the end of the Edo period
As with most domains in the han system, Ōtaki Domain consisted of several discontinuous territories calculated to provide the assigned kokudaka, based on periodic cadastral surveys and projected agricultural yields. In the case of Ōtaki Domain, the exclave it controlled in Mikawa Province as actually larger than its “home” territory in Kazusa.
Kazusa Province
21 villages in Isumi District
Mikawa Province
15 villages in Hazu District
10 villages in Kamo District
Yamato Province
1 village in Toichi District

List of daimyōs

References

Bolitho, Harold. (1974). Treasures Among Men: The Fudai Daimyo in Tokugawa Japan. New Haven: Yale University Press.  ; OCLC 185685588
Kodama Kōta 児玉幸多, Kitajima Masamoto 北島正元 (1966). Kantō no shohan 関東の諸藩. Tokyo: Shin Jinbutsu Ōraisha.
 Nussbaum, Louis Frédéric and Käthe Roth. (2005). Japan Encyclopedia. Cambridge: Harvard University Press. ; OCLC 48943301

External links
  Ōtaki on "Edo 300 HTML"

Notes

Domains of Japan
1590 establishments in Japan
States and territories established in 1590
1871 disestablishments in Japan
States and territories disestablished in 1871
Kazusa Province
History of Chiba Prefecture
Abe clan
Honda clan
Ōkōchi-Matsudaira clan